Daxu may refer to these towns in China:

Daxu, Anhui, in Hefei, Anhui
Daxu, Guigang, Guangxi
Daxu, Lingchuan County, Guangxi
Daxu, Hunan, in Jianghua County, Hunan
Daxu, Jiangsu, in Xuzhou, Jiangsu
Daxu, Zhejiang, in Xiangshan County, Zhejiang

See also
Daxue (disambiguation)